Vankleek Hill Collegiate Institute (also called VCI by students and staff) is a small, English high school operated by the Upper Canada District School Board (UCDSB) in the heart Town of Vankleek Hill, Ontario, Canada. It provides both academic and vocational programs to about 450 students (2008–09).

VCI also publishes an annual Yearbook consisting of the full school year in pictures.

Facilities 
Their gymnasium is often used for athletic events, both extracurricular
and intramural. It is also used for various special activities, such as 
school dances.
Their cafeteria is catered by Glen Fine Foods. 
The school's library includes a vast collection of books and multiple internet-enabled 
computers. VCI is equipped with two regulation tennis courts. The residents from Vankleek Hill are always welcome in using the courts.

Annual Green Day 
Green Day has become a proud, school-wide tradition at VCI. For 8 years and counting, VCI students and staff take time out of their busy schedules by helping out senior citizens in the Vankleek Hill community. They rake leaves and clean up lawns, front and back, to make room for all of that wonderful new spring growth.

Notable alumni
Dan McGillis - Retired NHL Hockey Player (Detroit Red Wings, Edmonton Oilers, Boston Bruins, San Jose Sharks, New Jersey Devils) as well as Adler Mannheim of the German DEL
Martin St-Louis - NHL Hockey Player (Tampa Bay Lightning, Calgary Flames), Art Ross Trophy Winner, Hart Trophy Winner

See also
List of high schools in Ontario

References

External links 
 School Board profile
 Vankleek Hill Collegiate Institute

High schools in Ontario
Educational institutions established in 1890
1890 establishments in Ontario